James D. Montgomery & Associates, Ltd. is a Chicago-based personal-injury and wrongful-death law firm.  The firm formerly served as the Chicago office of The Cochran Firm.

Attorneys

Partners
 James D. Montgomery, Sr.  James D. Montgomery, Sr. currently serves as a Trustee on the Board of Trustees to the University of Illinois.  Mr. Montgomery served as Corporation Counsel to the City of Chicago under Harold Washington.
 James M. Sanford
 John K. Kennedy

Associates
 Michelle M. Montgomery
 Daniel Watkins, II

Cases
 The firm represents the family of Rekia Boyd, who was shot and killed by Dante Servin, an off-duty Chicago police officer.
 The firm represents the family of Anthony Kyser, who was choked to death by a CVS store manager in an alley after allegedly stealing some toothpaste from a CVS store.
 The firm represents the family of Ontario Billups, who was shot and killed by Tracey A. Williams of the Chicago Police Department while unarmed.
 The firm is the lead counsel for plaintiffs in the litigation arising from the 2003 E2 nightclub stampede.
 The firm achieved a $16 million settlement from the City of Chicago for the police-involved shooting death of Latanya Haggerty.

See also
James D. Montgomery

References

External links
Official Website
Living Trust vs. Will
Federal Criminal Defense Attorney

Law firms based in Chicago